José Manuel Rodríguez (born July 28, 1982) is a Mexican professional baseball second baseman who plays for the Saraperos de Saltillo of the Mexican League, and Charros de Jalisco of the Mexican Pacific League, where he plays during the winter.

Professional career
Rodríguez began his career for the Saraperos de Saltillo of the Mexican League in 2006. Rodríguez played with the club every year through the 2015 season. On November 6, 2015, Rodríguez was traded to the Pericos de Puebla in exchange for Rolando Acosta. On February 21, 2017, Rodríguez was traded to the Acereros de Monclova alongside Chad Gaudin, Daric Barton, Nyjer Morgan, Rodolfo Amador, and Willy Taveras in exchange for Joaquin Lara. On April 26, 2018, Rodríguez was assigned to the Tigres de Quintana Roo. On April 3, 2019, Rodríguez re-signed with the Tigres for the 2019 season. On May 7, 2019, Rodríguez was loaned to the Saraperos de Saltillo. Rodríguez did not play in a game in 2020 due to the cancellation of the Mexican League season because of the COVID-19 pandemic.

International career
Rodriguez has played for the Mexico national baseball team at the 2008 Summer Olympics and the  2017 World Baseball Classic.

References

External links

1982 births
Living people
Acereros de Monclova players
Algodoneros de Guasave players
Baseball players from Sinaloa
Charros de Jalisco players
Chillicothe Paints players
Lincoln Saltdogs players
Mexican expatriate baseball players in the United States
Mexican League baseball left fielders
Mexican League baseball right fielders
Mexican League baseball second basemen
Mexican League baseball shortstops
Mexican League baseball third basemen
People from Guasave
Pericos de Puebla players
Saraperos de Saltillo players
Tigres de Quintana Roo players
2017 World Baseball Classic players